Violence and the Sacred is a 1972 book about the sacred by the French critic René Girard, in which the author explores the ritual role of sacrifice. The book received both positive reviews, which praised Girard's theory of the sacred, and more mixed assessments. Some commentators have seen the book as a work that expresses or points toward a Christian religious perspective. However, the book has also been seen as "atheistic" or "hostile to religion". Violence and the Sacred became highly influential, in anthropology, literary criticism, and even Christology. It has been compared to the classicist Walter Burkert's Homo Necans (1972). Girard further developed its ideas in a subsequent book, Things Hidden Since the Foundation of the World (1978).

Summary

Girard discusses the ritual role of sacrifice, seeking to explain the fact that it sometimes appears as "a sacred obligation to be neglected at grave peril" and it other times as "a sort of criminal activity entailing perils of equal gravity". He explores the concept of the "sacrificial crisis" and the role of the scapegoat. Aspects of Greek culture he explores include Greek tragedy, Ancient Greek religion, and the Greek philosopher Heraclitus. Among modern thinkers, he reviews the theories of the sociologist Henri Hubert and the anthropologist Marcel Mauss and discusses the work of the philosopher Friedrich Nietzsche and the intellectual Georges Bataille. He reevaluates Totem and Taboo (1913), a work by Sigmund Freud, the founder of psychoanalysis. He writes that while Totem and Taboo has been widely rejected, he views the work differently and sees its concept of collective murder as close to the themes of his own work. He also reevaluates Freud's theory of the Oedipus complex, and the incest taboo. He also discusses the work of the anthropologist Claude Lévi-Strauss.

Background and publication history
Violence and the Sacred was written while Girard was distinguished professor at the State University of New York at Buffalo and resulted from a decade of research. The book was first published in French in 1972 by Editions Bernard Grasset. In 1977, Johns Hopkins University Press published an English translation by Patrick Gregory. It was also published by The Athlone Press in 1988 and Continuum in 2005.

Reception
Girard was awarded the Prix de l'Académie française for Violence and the Sacred, which is considered his major work. It became a highly influential book in anthropology, literary criticism, and even Christology. Violence and the Sacred received positive reviews from G. H. de Radkowski in Le Monde, the critic Victor Brombert in The Chronicle of Higher Education, Frank McConnell in The New Republic, and Vincent Farenga in Comparative Literature. The book received mixed reviews from Homer Obred Brown in Modern Language Notes, Winifred Lambrecht in Library Journal, John E. Rexine in The Modern Language Journal, and James A. Aho in SA: Sociological Analysis. 

According to Chris Fleming, de Radkowski considered the book an "enormous intellectual achievement" in that it provided the "first authentically atheistic theory of religion and the sacred". Brombert described the book as "fascinating and ambitious", and important. He identified it as part of a trend toward interdisciplinary studies in France, and wrote that it provoked many reactions and that Esprit devoted a large part of an issue to it. He believed that Girard's treatment of Freud, of anthropology, and of linguistic data, would lead to critical reactions. He credited Girard with providing interesting discussions of Biblical stories, Greek myths and rituals, taboos, and the fears aroused by twins. He praised Girard's discussion of the "predicament of a modern society that seeks ever greater numbers of sacrificial victims in a desperate attempt to restore the efficacy of a lost sense of ritual". However, he believed that Girard's discussion of religion focused too much on violence and did not explain its most "important principles". He also found the work's methodology questionable.

McConnell considered the book important, and argued that it complimented the philosopher Michel Foucault's Discipline and Punish (1975). He praised Girard's discussion of the cultural origins of judicial systems and the relevance of the concept of the sacrificial crisis to modern society. Farenga described Girard's theory of sacrifice as "brilliant", though he believed that its details would be criticized. He found Girard's discussion of Freud convincing. He suggested that Violence and the Sacred reassessed the "Greco-Roman" tradition of western thought in the same way that Girard's subsequent book Things Hidden Since the Foundation of the World reassessed the "Judeo-Christian" tradition, and that Girard's work had a "Christological" background. He contrasted Girard's ideas with those of the philosopher Gilles Deleuze and the psychoanalyst Félix Guattari, as presented in Anti-Oedipus (1972), as well as with critical theory and deconstruction.

Brown maintained that Violence and the Sacred formed part of a body of work in which Girard provided valuable readings of literary texts and interpretations of myths. He compared it to the work of the critic Edward Said and the classicist Norman O. Brown. However, he believed it also had features that detracted from its virtues and would cause controversy. He argued that Girard's explanation of sacrifice must in turn depend on an explanation of ritual, and that Girard's thesis that collective murder produced human culture suffers from unresolved theoretical problems. He concluded that the work's importance derived not from its "claims to science" but from its "compelling vision of the plight of modern man". He suggested that, if exposing the nature of the "sacrificial crisis" undermines it and "destroys its authority and power to protect us from our own violent impulses" then Violence and the Sacred would be "the ultimate recognition leading to total planetary reciprocal violence that would destroy mankind." He found the book "distractingly shrill".

Lambrecht credited Girard with raising important questions and bringing together many different fields of inquiry, but argued that his work depended on controversial assumptions and that he "has a tendency to generalize data that might better have been left as particular examples." Rexine observed that the book received praise upon its publication in French despite being "acknowledged as unorthodox, even atheistic." He considered the work bold and "rich in ideas", and credited Girard with recognizing "the profound importance of the sacred, of ritual, of sacrifice, of religion, and of violence" in human society. However, he believed that Girard's analysis of the ancient Greek dramatists, his reappraisals of Freud and Lévi-Strauss, as well as his "African and Asian comparisons with ancient Greek ritual and religious practice", would be questioned by scholars. He criticized Girard for failing to distinguish between the concept of violence and that of power, and for basing his thesis about religion and violence primarily on ancient Greek religion while largely ignoring contemporary religions such as Christianity and Islam, as well as the Eastern religions. He also criticized his style of writing, finding it repetitive, pompous, and verbose.

Aho believed that the book deserved "careful consideration by researchers studying the links between religion and violence" and that it showed both the positive and negative aspects of interdisciplinary scholarship. He found it "convoluted" and "overly difficult". He suggested that Girard based his sociology of religion partly on an "intimate knowledge of mythology" and partly on his imagination. He believed that, like some of the founders of sociology, Girard was overly ambitious. He suggested that Girard was "unfamiliar with contemporary literature on scapegoating, the phenomenology of religious experience, and the sociologies of comparative religion and violence", and made untestable claims.

The classicist Norman O. Brown, the journalist Joseph Bottum, the theologian Leo D. Lefebure, and the philosopher Roger Scruton, have seen Violence and the Sacred as a work that expresses or points toward a Christian religious perspective. Brown maintained that Girard's purpose in Violence and the Sacred is to frighten people into returning to orthodox religion and that Pope John Paul II liked the book. According to Bottum, while literary critics gave the book "ecstatic reviews", many reviewers missed "the implications of Christian revelation" it contains. Bottum described the book as one of a series of works, including Things Hidden Since the Foundation of the World, in which Girard discusses the cultural role of the scapegoat. He believed that they cost Girard some of "the influence in American and European academic circles that he gained in the 1960s and 1970s". He attributed the decline of Girard's influence on literary criticism to his increasingly obvious interest in biblical revelation following the publication of Violence and the Sacred.

Lefebure identified Violence and the Sacred as part of a body of work that led Girard to conclude that "the Christian revelation unveils the patterns of violence and provides the divine response." He noted that, "Having become convinced that the gospel alone reveals the full truth of the human condition, Girard entered the Catholic Church", and that Girard's subsequent work Things Hidden Since the Foundation of the World expressed a "Christian perspective". Scruton, who has compared Violence and the Sacred to works by authors such as Nietzsche and Bataille, as well as to those of the composer Richard Wagner, the theologian Rudolf Otto, and the historian of religion Mircea Eliade, concluded that, despite its merits, Girard's "imaginative" theory fails to explain the sacred. He also suggested that the theory could be viewed as being in part a "Christian apologetic".

Fleming wrote that Violence and the Sacred, the work of Girard's that "Anglophone theorists" were most familiar with, appeared to suggest that Girard was "hostile to religion". He suggested that this view of the work as "atheistic" was a result of Girard's suggesting that "the social and the sacred are coeval; that violence lies at the heart of the sacred; and that the institutions of the sacred give concrete cultural form to the misrecognition and transcendalization of human violence." However, he maintained that Things Hidden Since the Foundation of the World complicated this view of Girard's perspective without simply overturning it. He saw Girard's theory of sacrifice, as expressed in Violence and the Sacred, as having significant strengths. It has been compared to the classicist Walter Burkert's Homo Necans by the literature scholar William Johnsen and the religious studies scholar Catherine Bell; Johnsen also praised Girard's discussion of Freud, describing it as brilliant. The philosopher Ludger Hagedorn questioned Girard's use of Heraclitus, his emphasis on violence rather than power, and his understanding of Nietzsche's concept of the Apollonian and Dionysian.

See also
 The Accursed Share
 The Soul of the World

References

Footnotes

Bibliography
Books

 
 
 
 
 
 
 
 

Journals

 
 
 
 
 
  
 
 
 

Online articles

 
 

1972 non-fiction books
Books about religion
Books about the Oedipus complex
Books about violence
Books by René Girard
Éditions Grasset books
French non-fiction books